Michael Warren may refer to:

Actors and sportsmen
Michael Warren II, American football running back
Michael Warren (actor) (born 1946), American TV actor and college basketball player
Michael Warren (footballer) (born 1982), Australian rules footballer
Mike Warren (baseball) (born 1961), baseball player

Artists
Michael Warren (artist) (born 1938), British wildlife artist
Michael Warren (sculptor) (born 1950), Irish sculptor
Mike Warren (designer) (born 1980), American designer and artist

Others
Michael Warren (anthropologist), forensic anthropologist and associate professor at the University of Florida
Mike Warren (mayor) (born 1964), current mayor of Adamstown